Gadimyxa arctica is a species of parasitic myxozoan. Together with G. atlantica and G. sphaerica, they infect Gadus morhua and Arctogadus glacialis by developing coelozoically in bisporic plasmodia in their urinary systems. These 3 species' spores exhibit two morphological forms: wide and subspherical, being both types bilaterally symmetrical along the suture line. The wide spores have a mean width ranging from 7.5-10μm, respectively, while the subspherical ones range from 5.3-8μm in mean width. The subspherical forms of Gadimyxa are similar to Ortholinea, differing in the development of the spores and in the arrangement of the polar capsules.

References

Further reading
Køie, Marianne, et al. "The parasite fauna of Arctogadus glacialis (Peters)(Gadidae) from western and eastern Greenland." Polar Biology 31.9 (2008): 1017–1021.
Køie, Marianne, et al. "A parvicapsulid (Myxozoa) infecting Sprattus sprattus and Clupea harengus (Clupeidae) in the Northeast Atlantic uses Hydroides norvegicus (Serpulidae) as invertebrate host." Folia parasitologica 60.2 (2013): 149–154.
Yurakhno, V. M. "Two New Families and a New Species of Myxosporeans (Myxozoa, Myxosporea) from the Mediterranean and Black Sea Fishes."Вестник зоологии (2011).
BARTOŠOVÁ, PAVLA, et al. "Phylogenetic position of Sphaerospora testicularis and Latyspora scomberomori n. gen. n. sp.(Myxozoa) within the marine urinary clade." Parasitology 138.03 (2011): 381–393.

External links

Parvicapsulidae
Animals described in 2007